Big Daddy is a horror film directed, produced and written by Carl K. Hittleman. It was filmed in 1965 under the title Paradise Road, but not released until 1969.

Plot
A man (Reed Sherman) visiting the Florida Everglades falls for an illiterate girl, and competes with the mysterious A. Lincoln Beauregard (Victor Buono) for her affections. He also encounters vicious alligators and a voodoo witch doctor.

Cast

 Victor Buono as  A. Lincoln Beauregard 
 Joan Blondell
 Chill Wills
 Tisha Sterling
 Reed Sherman
 William Benedict
 John Hale
 Virginia Sale
 Tanya Lemani
 Ned Romero
 Kelton Garwood
 Louis Hart 
 Hank Worden
 Arline Hunter

See also
 List of American films of 1969

References

External links
 
 
 

1969 films
American horror films
1969 horror films
1960s English-language films
Films directed by Carl K. Hittleman
1960s American films